Wiklenman Vicente González [Wiki] (born May 17, 1974) is a former Venezuelan catcher in Major League Baseball who played for the San Diego Padres, Seattle Mariners and Washington Nationals in parts of seven seasons spanning 1999–2006. Listed at 5' 11" (1.80 m), 175 lb. (79 k), González batted and threw right-handed. He was born in Maracay, Aragua.

Career
In a seven-season career, González posted a .238 batting average with 17 home runs and 103 RBI, including 75 runs, 41 doubles, three triples, and three stolen bases in 283 games played.

His most productive season came in 2001 with San Diego, when he batted a .275/.335/.463 slash line with eight homers and 27 RBI.

A slow runner, González holds the curious distinction of having hit into a 5-4-3 triple play in 2002 while playing for the Padres, during a game against the New York Mets just on his birthday.

In 2008 González signed with the St. George Roadrunners of the independent Golden Baseball League. Then, in February 2009 he was traded to the Sussex Skyhawks of the Can-Am League. He was released on April 2, 2009.

In between, González played winter ball with four clubs of the Venezuelan League during the 1993–2010 seasons.

See also
 List of Major League Baseball players from Venezuela

References

External links

1974 births
Living people
Augusta GreenJackets players
Cardenales de Lara players
Charlotte Knights players
Gulf Coast Pirates players
Lake Elsinore Storm players
Las Vegas Stars (baseball) players
Leones del Caracas players
Major League Baseball catchers
Major League Baseball players from Venezuela
Mobile BayBears players
Navegantes del Magallanes players
New Orleans Zephyrs players
Sportspeople from Maracay
Portland Beavers players
Rancho Cucamonga Quakes players
San Diego Padres players
Seattle Mariners players
St. George Roadrunners players
Tacoma Rainiers players
Tiburones de La Guaira players
Tigres de Aragua players
Venezuelan expatriate baseball players in the United States
Washington Nationals players